Ervin Kereszthy (5 October 1909 – 15 July 1972), also known as Ervin Krebs, was a Hungarian coxswain. He competed at the 1936 Summer Olympics in Berlin with the men's eight where they came fifth.

References

1909 births
1972 deaths
Hungarian male rowers
Olympic rowers of Hungary
Rowers at the 1936 Summer Olympics
Rowers from Budapest
Coxswains (rowing)
European Rowing Championships medalists